Ghatsa menoni is a species of ray-finned fish in the genus Ghatsa.

References

Fish described in 1995